Mt. Whittier was a ski area located in West Ossipee, New Hampshire.  Though it shared a name with a nearby mountain in the Ossipee Range, the ski area was actually located on Nickerson Mountain.

While the exact opening date is not known, the ski area was in operation by the end of the 1940s, serviced by surface lifts.  In 1963 New Hampshire's second gondola lift was installed at Mt. Whittier.  The gondola was unusual in that it had three terminals - a bottom terminal on the east side of  Route 16, a second lower terminal at the base of the ski area, and a top terminal near the summit of Nickerson Mountain.  The remains of the gondola, including the towers and cables, still cross Route 16 today.

In addition to the ski operation, Mt. Whittier also offered summer activities, anchored with scenic gondola rides. Additional summer attractions were offered toward the end of the area's life, including slides and bumper boats.  Poor winters in the early 1980s, along with a lack of snowmaking, led to the demise of the ski area.

Though the ski area has been closed since 1985, its lifts and trails are still visible from Route 16.  A business named Mount Madness Adventure Center was started in the base area of Mt. Whittier.  There have been various attempts at restarting snow sports, including snow tubing, snowcat skiing, and snowmobile racing.

External links
  Mount Madness Adventure Center - located at the base of the defunct ski area
 Mt. Whittier History (New England Ski History)

References

Buildings and structures in Carroll County, New Hampshire
Defunct ski areas and resorts in New Hampshire
Ossipee, New Hampshire